Eriogonum crosbyae is a species of wild buckwheat known by the common name Crosby's buckwheat. It is native to southcentral Oregon and northwestern Nevada in the United States. Some treatments include plants in Montana and Idaho as members of this species. This plant was first discovered in the Guano Valley in Lake County, Oregon, in 1978 by Bureau of Land Management botanist Virginia Crosby, and it was named for her in 1981.

This perennial herb forms mats of stems from a branching caudex. It is hairless to hairy to woolly in texture and sometimes glandular, and it is greenish or grayish in color. The woolly leaves are up to 3 centimeters long. The inflorescence is a headlike cluster of yellow or cream flowers.

This plant only grows in tuff, a soil composed of volcanic ash, or tuffaceous sandstone. The substrate is light tan to white in color. There are few other plants around but species in the habitat may include Astragalus spp., Atriplex confertifolia, Chrysothamnus nauseosus, Tetradymia glabrata, Artemisia spp., Elymus cinereus, Stanleya viridiflora, Sphaeralcea sp., Ipomopsis congesta, Astragalus tiehmii, and Cryptantha schoolcraftii.

Mining is a significant threat to this species. Most Nevada occurrences are on land leased by mining operations. This plant's specific habitat type is targeted for mining. Mining has already destroyed some occurrences. "Range improvement projects" are another type of threat. Off-road vehicles are in use in the area. The plant also appears to have low recruitment.

References

External links
USDA Plants Profile for Eriogonum crosbyae

crosbyae
Flora of Nevada
Flora of Oregon
Flora of the Great Basin
Endemic flora of the United States
Plants described in 1981